Paul Antoine Louis Bouchard (5 August 1853, Paris – 1937, Paris) was a French painter; best known for his Orientalist scenes.

Biography 
He was a student of Gustave Boulanger, Jules Lefebvre and Fernand Cormon. At the beginning of his career, he produced historical scenes; primarily from the Middle Ages. He later broadened his themes to include Orientalist scenes and Russian cityscapes.

His exhibitions at the Salon began in 1880, and he would continue to have showings there annually until 1930. He was awarded a bronze medal at the Exposition Universelle of 1900.

He was named a Knight of the Legion of Honor in 1908.

His painting, The Almahs, was used on the back cover of the revue, Grand écrivain, in 1987, to illustrate an article about Arthur de Gobineau and his dreamlike view of the Middle East. The original is at the Musée d'Orsay.

References

External links 

 More works by Bouchard @ ArtNet

1853 births
1937 deaths
19th-century French painters
French orientalists
Cityscape artists
Painters from Paris
20th-century French painters